Kanchana is a  2012 Indian Tamil-language thriller soap opera that aired Monday through Friday on Vijay TV from 23 July 2012 to 14 September 2012 for 70 Episodes. The show starred Pooja Ramachandran, Kuyili. It was director by Azhagar.

References

External links
Official website
STAR Vijay on Youtube
STAR Vijay US
Star Vijay Malaysia

Star Vijay original programming
Tamil-language horror fiction television series
Tamil-language thriller television series
2012 Tamil-language television series debuts
Tamil-language television shows
2012 Tamil-language television series endings